Awit Para Sa'yo is a studio album by Filipino singer Erik Santos, released on August 12, 2011 by Star Music in the Philippines in CD and cassette format and in digital download through iTunes and Amazon.com. It consists of twelve tracks including eight original OPM compositions and four OPM cover songs including Richard Reynoso's hit "Paminsan-minsan".

Background
Awit Para Sa'yo also includes an original composition of Erik Santos called "Hanggang Kailan Kita Mamahalin". The carrier single is "Kulang Ako Kung Wala Ka" accompanied by a music video shot by Raymund Isaac. The song became number 1 upon release on Tambayan 101.9 FM Tambayan Top 10 and gain the number two spot on 90.7 FM Love Radio Top 10 Chart and Kwatro Kantos chart.

Track listing

 Track 5 "Sana Ikaw" is originally by Piolo Pascual
 Track 8 "Pangarap Ko Ang Ibigin Ka" is originally by Regine Velasquez
 Track 9 "Di Lang Ikaw" is originally by Juris
 Track 12 "Paminsan-minsan" is originally by Richard Reynoso
 Track 14 "Muling Buksan Ang Puso" is originally by Basil Valdez

References

See also
 Erik Santos discography
 List of best-selling albums in the Philippines
 Erik Santos Official Site
 Twitter of Awit Para Sa'yo
 Facebook of Awit Para Sa'yo

Star Music albums
2011 albums
Erik Santos albums